A Fine Frenzy Live at the House of Blues Chicago is a live album by A Fine Frenzy (the musical moniker for Alison Sudol), released on November 23, 2009 by Virgin Records.

Background and composition
The album features ten songs, nine of which are from her 2007 debut album One Cell in the Sea: "Come On, Come Out", "You Picked Me", "Rangers", "Near to You", "The Minnow and the Trout", "Ashes and Wine", "Last of Days", "Borrowed Time", and "Almost Lover". The album also includes a cover version of "Fever" (Eddie Cooley, Otis Blackwell), which was originally recorded by American singer Little Willie John in 1956.

Track listing

Track listing adapted from iTunes.

References

2009 live albums
A Fine Frenzy albums
Albums recorded at the House of Blues
Virgin Records live albums